Taran Hourie Killam (born April 1, 1982) is an American actor, comedian, writer, producer, director, and singer. Killam first garnered attention for his brief stint on the Fox comedy series MADtv during its seventh season between 2001 and 2002, followed by his wider success as a cast member on the NBC sketch comedy series Saturday Night Live from 2010 to 2016. He has also appeared in other television series such as The Amanda Show, How I Met Your Mother, New Girl, and Single Parents. Killam is also known for his portrayal of a teen pop star in the 2004 Disney Channel Original Movie Stuck in the Suburbs. He voices the title character on the PBS children's cartoon series Nature Cat. 

Killam performed the role of King George III in the Broadway production of Hamilton at the Richard Rodgers Theatre, ending his run on the evening of April 13, 2017.

Early life
Killam was born on April 1, 1982, in Culver City, California, and lived in Big Bear Lake, California, until age 15. His mother toured with The Charlie Daniels Band and has been described as a singer-songwriter. His father was a part of the City Garage Theatre Group and has been described as having had acting ambitions. Killam is also the great-nephew of Rosemarie Bowe, wife of actor Robert Stack.

Killam attended the Los Angeles County High School for the Arts. He attended the UCLA's School of Theater, Film and Television "as a musical theater student", where he stated he "spent much of his time working on UCLA's Theater Festival". He left UCLA to pursue his acting career.

Career

Early career
In 1994, Killam made his first film appearance as a boy in Naked Gun : The Final Insult. Killam was featured on Nickelodeon's The Amanda Show, a sketch-comedy vehicle for Amanda Bynes. He played Spaulding, a boy with a crush on Moody in the soap opera parody "Moody's Point".

Killam joined the cast of MADtv as a featured player during its seventh season from 2001 to 2002. Of the 25 episodes that aired during MADtvs seventh season, Killam appeared in 13. Joining the MADtv cast at age 19, Killam was the youngest cast member hired on the show and the only cast member on MADtv to get his start on children's shows (similar to Kenan Thompson on Saturday Night Live). He was a regular cast member on the third and fourth seasons of Wild 'N Out. In 2005, Killam co-starred in the television pilot Nobody's Watching, which never aired on network TV.  The pilot gained popularity after it was leaked online and webisodes were produced from 2006 to 2007.

Killam co-starred in the 2004 Disney Channel original film Stuck in the Suburbs. After MADtv, Killam appeared on TV shows such as Jake in Progress, Still Standing, Boston Public, Drake & Josh, Do Over, Roswell and Judging Amy. He has appeared on Scrubs and Scrubs: Interns as Jimmy (the Overly Touchy Orderly). Killam appeared as a contestant on the December 7, 2006 episode of The Price Is Right.

He has been in Big Fat Liar, Just Married, Anderson's Cross, and My Best Friend's Girl.

Killam was a member of the Los Angeles-based improvisational and sketch-comedy troupe the Groundlings. He retired from the main company in 2012.

Saturday Night Live
On September 25, 2010, Killam joined the cast of Saturday Night Live for the 36th season, making him the second Nickelodeon veteran (after Kenan Thompson) to join SNL and the second SNL cast member who was previously a cast member on the sketch show MADtv (after Jeff Richards). Killam named Eddie Murphy as his favorite SNL cast member and Arcade Fire as his favorite musical guest. In August 2016, Killam and castmate Jay Pharoah left the show. Killam said he was not told why his contract was not renewed.

Other work
In December 2011, Killam replicated the Robyn video "Call Your Girlfriend" in a small writer's room and posted it to YouTube. The video went viral and by February 2022, it had been viewed more than 1,277,875 times. The late night antics briefly became an Internet phenomenon and garnered Killam media and public attention. When interviewed on Late Night with Jimmy Fallon, Killam stated that he had not known the dance shown in the song's official video until Robyn was scheduled to appear on SNL as a guest; he watched the video repeatedly until he could perform it himself.

In 2011, Killam appeared in Community episode "Regional Holiday Music" as Mr. Radison (Mr. Rad), a parody of Will Schuester from Glee. In 2012 he appeared in iCarly episode "iMeet the First Lady" as a Secret Service agent.

On November 10, 2012, Killam appeared with Kenan Thompson and Anne Hathaway in a short video, "The Legend of Mokiki and the Sloppy Swish". Mokiki is a laboratory test subject who wanders Manhattan performing a shuffling dance move known as the "Sloppy Swish". The sketch briefly became an Internet phenomenon and garnered Killam media and public attention. Mike Ryan of The Huffington Post wrote, "It is one of the most bizarre things to ever air on SNL, yet, the next day, everyone was talking about the Sloppy Swish."

Killam co-starred in the 2013 comedy film The Heat. Killam voices Zip "Frantic" Danger on the Hulu original series The Awesomes.

In 2013 Killam ventured into the spy genre and the comics industry with The Illegitimates, a six-issue comics miniseries co-written by Marc Andreyko, illustrated by Kevin Sharpe and published by IDW Publishing. The series focuses on a team of illegitimate siblings who are charged with taking the place of their father, Jack Steele, a James Bond-like spy, after his death. The first issue was published December 18, 2013, and received mixed reviews.

Killam appears in the 2013 film 12 Years a Slave, playing the role of Abram Hamilton, one of the kidnappers who brings the main character into slavery.

Killam is a fan of the Teenage Mutant Ninja Turtles franchise, Raphael his favorite turtle, and successfully lobbied for a role in the 2014 film as Channel 5 staff.

Killam made six guest appearances as Gary Blauman on his wife Cobie Smulders' TV series, How I Met Your Mother. His first appearance was in the March 20, 2006, episode, "Life Among the Gorillas" and the final one was the March 24, 2014, episode, "The End of the Aisle".

In 2015, Killam provided the voice of the titular character on the PBS Kids show Nature Cat, along with SNL alumni Kate McKinnon, Bobby Moynihan, and Kenan Thompson.

On January 17, 2017, Killam succeeded Rory O'Malley in the role of King George III in the Broadway musical Hamilton.

Killam produced, scripted, directed and starred in the comic hitman film Killing Gunther, given a general release in fall 2017. Arnold Schwarzenegger, who played Gunther in the film, served as executive producer for it.

In March 2018, Killam was cast as a lead in the comedy pilot Single Parents for ABC, which was picked up to series for a premiere on September 26 of that year.

Personal life
After several years of dating, Killam and actress Cobie Smulders became engaged in January 2009. They married on September 8, 2012, in Solvang, California. The couple has two daughters, born in 2009 and 2015. 

Killam is an avid fan of the Los Angeles Rams, having been reported wearing the team's home jersey at local home games.

Filmography

Film

Television

Theatre

Bibliography
 The Illegitimates #1–6 (2013)

References

External links

Official SNL cast biography

1982 births
Living people
20th-century American male actors
21st-century American male actors
American male child actors
American male comedians
American male film actors
American impressionists (entertainers)
American male television actors
American male voice actors
American male musical theatre actors
Male actors from Greater Los Angeles
American comics writers
People from Big Bear Lake, California
People from Culver City, California
Writers from California
University of California, Los Angeles alumni
Los Angeles County High School for the Arts alumni
American sketch comedians
Comedians from California
20th-century American comedians
21st-century American comedians